The 731st Airlift Squadron is a flying unit of the United States Air Force assigned to the Air Force Reserve Command and part of the 302d Airlift Wing at Peterson Air Force Base, Colorado. It operates Lockheed C-130H Hercules aircraft providing global airlift. The squadron also has the specialized mission of Modular Airborne Fire Fighting System.

The squadron was activated in June 1942 as the 331st Bombardment Squadron. After training in the United States, the squadron deployed to the European Theater of Operations in the spring of 1943.  It participated in the strategic bombing campaign against Germany until V-E Day, earning two Distinguished Unit Citations for its actions.  It returned to the United States in December 1945, and was inactivated at the Port of Embarkation.

The squadron was reactivated at Marietta Army Air Field, Georgia in the reserves in 1947, but was not fully manned or equipped until 1949, when it began to receive Douglas B-26 Invaders.  It was inactivated on 20 March 1951 after being called to active duty for the Korean War, with its personnel used as "fillers" to bring other units up to strength.

When the Air Force reserves revived their combat units in 1952, the squadron was activated as a tactical reconnaissance unit.  It briefly returned to the light bomber role in 1955, but in 1957, became an airlift unit as the 731st Troop Carrier Squadron.  It has served as a reserve airlift unit since then, including a period on active duty during the Cuban Missile Crisis.

Mission

Tactical Airlift
Aerial fire-fighting for the U.S. Forest Service.

History

World War II

Initial organization and training
The squadron was activated at MacDill Field, Florida, on 15 June 1942 as the 331st Bombardment Squadron, one of the original squadrons of the 94th Bombardment Group.  The AAF had decided to concentrate training of heavy bomber units under Second Air Force, and the squadron moved to Pendleton Field, Oregon, one of that command's bases, two weeks later to begin training with the Boeing B-17 Flying Fortress.

The squadron cadre received its initial training at Pendleton. It moved to different bases for Phase I (individual training) and Phase II (crew training), completing Phase III (unit training) at Pueblo Army Air Base, Colorado. The air echelon of the squadron began ferrying their aircraft to the European Theater of Operations around the first of April 1943. The ground echelon left Pueblo on 18 April for Camp Kilmer, New Jersey and the New York Port of Embarkation on 18 April.

Combat in the European Theater

The squadron began assembling at RAF Earls Colne in mid May, but Eighth Air Force decided to transfer its new Martin B-26 Marauder units from VIII Bomber Command to VIII Air Support Command and concentrate them on bases closer to the European continent.  As a result, the 323d Bombardment Group moved to Earls Colne on 14 June, forcing the 94th Group and its squadrons to relocate to RAF Bury St. Edmunds, which would be its combat station for the rest of the war.  It flew its first combat mission (and what would be its only mission from Earls Colne) on 13 June against the airfield at Saint-Omer, France.  Until the end of the war, the squadron participated in the strategic bombing campaign against Germany.  It atacked port facilities at Saint Nazaire, shipyards at Kiel, an aircraft plant at Kassel, oil facilities at Merseburg and ball bearing facilities at Eberhausen.

During an attack on the Messerschmitt factory at Regensberg on 17 August 1943, the squadron was without escort after its escorting Republic P-47 Thunderbolts reached the limit of their range. It withstood repeated attacks, first by enemy Messerschmitt Bf 109 and Focke-Wulf Fw 190 interceptors, then by Messerschmitt Bf 110 and Junkers Ju 88 night fighters, to strike its target, earning its first Distinguished Unit Citation (DUC).  This was a "shuttle" mission, with the squadron recovering on bases in north Africa, rather than returning to England.

On 11 January 1944, it attacked a Messerschmitt aircraft parts manufacturing plant at Brunswick/Waggum Airfield.  Weather conditions deteriorated during the flight to the target, preventing part of the escorting fighters from reaching the bombers and resulting in the squadron's bombers being recalled.  However, the wing leader was unable to authenticate the recall message and continued to the target.  In contrast, fair weather to the east of the target permitted the Luftwaffe to concentrate its fighter defenses into one of its largest defensive formations since October 1943. Despite heavy flak in the target area, the squadron bombed accurately and earned its second DUC for this action.  The squadron participated in Big Week, the concentrated campaign against the German aircraft manufacturing industry from 20 to 25 February 1944.  It bombed transportation, communication and petroleum industrial targets during Operation Lumberjack the final push across the Rhine and into Germany.

The squadron was occasionally diverted from its strategic mission to perform air support and interdiction missions.  In the preparation for Operation Overlord, the invasion of Normandy, it flew Operation Crossbow attacks on V-1 flying bomb and V-2 rocket launch sites.  On D-Day, it attacked enemy positions near the beachhead.  It attacked enemy troops and artillery batteries during Operation Cobra, the breakout at Saint Lo in July 1944, and at Brest, France the following month.  It attacked marshalling yards, airfields and strong points near the battlefield during the Battle of the Bulge in late December 1944 through early January 1945.

The squadron flew its last mission on 21 April 1945.  Following V-E Day it dropped leaflets to displaced persons and German civilians on what were called "Nickling" flights  The squadron was scheduled to be part of the occupation forces, but those plans were cancelled in September 1945.  Starting in November, its planes were transferred to other units or flown back to the United States.  Its remaining personnel sailed on the SS Lake Champlain on 12 December 1945.  Upon reaching the Port of Embarkation, the squadron was inactivated.

Reserve
The squadron was again activated under Air Defense Command (ADC) at Marietta Army Air Field, Georgia in May 1947 as a air reserve unit and again assigned to the 94th Bombardment Group.  Although nominally a very heavy bomber unit, It is not clear whether or not the squadron was fully staffed or equipped.  In 1948 Continental Air Command assumed responsibility for managing reserve and Air National Guard units from ADC.  As Greenville was scheduled to go into standby status and as the reserves reorganized under the Wing Base Organization, the squadron moved to join its parent wing at Marietta.

In June 1949, the squadron was redesignated as a light bomber unit.  Reserve wings were authorized four operational squadrons, rather than the three of active duty wings.  However, the squadrons were manned at 25% of normal strength.  The squadron began to equip with the Douglas B-26 Invader. All reserve combat units were mobilized for the Korean War.  The 331st was called to active duty on 10 March 1951.  Its personnel and equipment were used to bring other units up to strength, and the squadron was inactivated ten days later.

Reactivated in 1952 with RB-26 Invader photo-reconnaissance aircraft; Curtiss C-46 Commando transports; North American P-51 Mustangs, and other second-line aircraft.   In 1957, moved from Scott Air Force Base, Illinois to Laurence G. Hanscom Field, Massachusetts and re-equipped with Fairchild C-119 Flying Boxcars for tactical airlift.  Activated during the Cuban Missile Crisis in 1962; returned to reserve status after crisis was resolved.  In 1966, re-equipped with Douglas C-124 Globemaster IIs for performing strategic airlift on a worldwide scale.   Reassigned to various Air Force reserve wings; flying Fairchild C-123 Providers until inactivation in 1982.    Reactivated in Colorado in the Air Force Reserve same date and equipped with Lockheed C-130 Hercules.

Lineage
 Constituted as the 331st Bombardment Squadron (Heavy) on 28 January 1942
 Activated on 15 June 1942
 Redesignated 331st Bombardment Squadron, Heavy on 20 August 1943
 Inactivated on 29 November 1945
 Redesignated 331st Bombardment Squadron, Very Heavy on 13 May 1947
 Activated in the reserve on 29 May 1947
 Redesignated 331st Bombardment Squadron, Light on 26 June 1949
 Ordered to active service on 10 March 1951
 Inactivated on 20 March 1951
 Redesignated 331st Tactical Reconnaissance Squadron on 26 May 1952
 Activated in the reserve on 14 June 1952
 Redesignated 331st Bombardment Squadron, Tactical on 18 May 1955
 Redesignated 731st Troop Carrier Squadron, Medium on 1 July 1957
 Ordered to active service on 28 October 1962
 Relieved from active duty on 28 November 1962
 Redesignated: 731st Military Airlift Squadron on 1 January 1967
 Redesignated: 731st Tactical Airlift Squadron on 1 October 1972
 Inactivated on 1 October 1982
 Activated in the reserve on 1 October 1982
 Redesignated 731st Airlift Squadron on 1 February 1992

Assignments
 94th Bombardment Group, 15 June 1942 – 29 November 1945
 94th Bombardment Group, 29 May 1947 – 20 March 1951
 94th Tactical Reconnaissance Group (later 94th Bombardment Group, 94th Troop Carrier Group), 14 June 1952
 94th Troop Carrier Wing, 14 April 1959
 901st Troop Carrier Group (later 901 Military Airlift Group 901st Tactical Airlift Group), 11 February 1963
 439th Tactical Airlift Wing, 1 April 1974
 901st Tactical Airlift Group, 1 October 1982
 302d Tactical Airlift Wing (later 302d Airlift Wing), 1 April 1985
 302d Operations Group, 1 August 1992 – present

Stations

 MacDill Field, Florida, 15 June 1942
 Pendleton Field, Oregon, 29 June 1942
 Davis-Monthan Field, Arizona, 29 August 1942
 Biggs Field, Texas, 1 November 1942
 Pueblo Army Air Base, Colorado, 3 January–17 April 1943
 RAF Earls Colne (AAF-358), England, 11 May 1943
 RAF Bury St. Edmunds (AAF-468), England, c. 13 June 1943 – 22 November 1945
 Camp Kilmer, New Jersey, c. 27–29 November 1945
 Marietta Army Air Field (later Dobbins Air Force Base), Georgia, 29 May 1947 – 20 March 1951
 Dobbins Air Force Base, Georgia, 14 June 1952
 Scott Air Force Base, Illinois, 18 May 1955
 Laurence G. Hanscom Field, Massachusetts, 16 November 1957
 Westover Air Reserve Base, Massachusetts, 17 September 1973 – 1 October 1982
 Peterson Air Force Base, Colorado, 1 October 1982 – present

Aircraft

 Boeing B-17 Flying Fortress (1942–1945)
 North American T-6 Texan (1947–1950, 1952–1954)
 Beechcraft T-7 Navigator (1947–1951)
 Beechcraft T-11 Kansan (1947–1951)
 Douglas B-26 Invader (1949–1951, 1953–1957)
 Curtiss C-46 Commando (1952–1955)
 North American P-51 Mustang (1953–1955)
 North American T-28 Trojan (1953–1954)
 Beechcraft C-45 Expeditor (1953–1955)
 Lockheed T-33 T-Bird (1954–1955)
 Lockheed F-80 Shooting Star (1954–1955)
 Douglas RB-26 Invader (1954–1955)
 Republic F-84 Thunderjet (1954–1955)
 Douglas C-47 Skytrain (1955)
 Fairchild C-119 Flying Boxcar (1957–1966)
 Douglas C-124 Globemaster II (1966–1972)
 Fairchild C-123 Provider (1972–1982)
 Lockheed C-130 Hercules (1982 – present)

See also
 B-17 Flying Fortress units of the United States Army Air Forces
 List of A-26 Invader operators

References

Notes
 Explanatory notes

 Citations

Bibliography

 
 
 
 
 
 
 

0731
Military units and formations in Colorado